USS Crow (AMS-7/YMS-215) was a  acquired by the U.S. Navy for the task of removing mines that had been placed in the water to prevent ships from passing.

Crow was constructed by Robert Jacob Inc., City Island, New York. She was laid down on 18 August 1942, launched on 22 February 1943, and was ready-for-sea on 22 July 1943.

YMS-215 was reclassified AMS-7 on 17 February 1947 and named Crow the following day.

Crow was struck from the Navy list on 1 November 1959.

References

External links 
 

YMS-1-class minesweepers of the United States Navy
Ships built in City Island, Bronx
1943 ships
World War II minesweepers of the United States